Harry Douglass Hough (June 1, 1883 in Trenton, New Jersey – April 20, 1935) was a professional basketball player and college coach.  He played professionally for 22 seasons and is considered the first dominant player in the pro game. 

In 1908 the Pittsburgh South Side team paid him $300 a month to play for them, making him the highest paid basketball player in the world.  He also served as the head coach at the University of Pittsburgh Panthers basketball team during the 1907–08 season guiding his team to a 10–6 record, while also attending the university's chemistry department. He also coached at  Princeton University during the 1910–11 season. 

In the 1909–10 season, playing for Pittsburgh South Side in the Central Basketball League Hough made 963 free throws, the most free throws recorded by any professional player in a single season. 
In that era each team designated a player to shoot all team free throws.

References

External links
 Pro Basketball Encyclopedia

1883 births
1935 deaths
American men's basketball players
Basketball coaches from New Jersey
Basketball players from Trenton, New Jersey
Pittsburgh Panthers men's basketball coaches
Princeton Tigers men's basketball coaches